Montclair is a southern suburb of Durban, KwaZulu-Natal, South Africa. It lies west of Clairwood and north of Woodlands.

References

Suburbs of Durban